Plasma kallikrein (serum kallikrein, kininogenin, kallikrein I, kallikrein II, kininogenase, kallikrein, callicrein, glumorin, padreatin, padutin, kallidinogenase, bradykininogenase, panceatic kallikrein, onokrein P, dilminal D, depot-Padutin, urokallikrein, urinary kallikrein) is an enzyme. This enzyme catalyses the following chemical reaction

 Selective cleavage of some Arg- and Lys- bonds, including Lys-Arg and Arg-Ser in (human) kininogen to release bradykinin

Plasma kallikrein and its precursor are encoded by the KLKB1 gene.

This enzyme is formed from prekallikrein (Fletcher factor) by factor XIIa.

Function 
Plasma prekallikrein is a glycoprotein that participates in the surface-dependent activation of blood coagulation, fibrinolysis, kinin generation and inflammation.  It is synthesized in the liver and secreted into the blood as a single polypeptide chain.  Plasma prekallikrein is converted to plasma kallikrein by factor XIIa by the cleavage of an internal Arg-Ile bond.  Plasma kallikrein therefore is composed of a heavy chain and a light chain held together by a disulfide bond.  The heavy chain originates from the amino-terminal end of the zymogen and contains 4 tandem repeats of 90 or 91 amino acids.  Each repeat harbors a novel structure called the apple domain.  The heavy chain is required for the surface-dependent pro-coagulant activity of plasma kallikrein.  The light chain contains the active site or catalytic domain of the enzyme and is homologous to the trypsin family of serine proteases. Plasma prekallikrein deficiency causes a prolonged activated partial thromboplastin time in patients.

Interactions 
Kallikrein and prekallikrein have been shown to interact with High-molecular-weight kininogen.

References

Further reading

External links 
 

EC 3.4.21